Hao Bailin or Hao Bolin (26 June 1934 – 7 March 2018) was a Chinese theoretical physicist, an academician of the Chinese Academy of Sciences, and Fudan University professor.

Biography
Hao was born in Beijing, 1934. He graduated from then Beijing Russian Institute in 1954, then went to Kharkiv and studied mining at Kharkov Engineering-Economic Institute. He transferred to the Department of Mathematics and Physics, Kharkiv University in 1956 and completed his bachelor's degree in the next three years.

He entered the Institute of Physics, Chinese Academy of Sciences as a trainee researcher afterwards. He went to Moscow State University and Soviet Academy of Sciences for the further studying on physics since 1959.

Hao had meant to become a postgraduate under Lev Landau, but Landau was injured in a road accident in 1962, he returned to China without a postgraduate diploma.

He continued his job in CAS until the Cultural Revolution began. During the decade, he participated the Task 1019 for the military.  Hao was elected as an academician of the Chinese Academy of Sciences in 1980. Hao took interdisciplinary research programmes later, he also sequenced DNA since 1997.

Personal life
Hao had three siblings. Their father, Jingsheng was a botanist, thus Bailin was supposedly named after a Chinese native tree, Cupressus funebris.

Hao met Zhang Shuyu, a Chinese student from Jiangxi province, in Kharkiv. They married in the late 1950s, and had two children.

Death
Hao died on 7 March 2018, aged 83.

References

External links
 Hao Bailin's personal homepage

1934 births
2018 deaths
Beijing Foreign Studies University alumni
Chinese expatriates in the Soviet Union
Educators from Beijing
Academic staff of Fudan University
Members of the Chinese Academy of Sciences
Physicists from Beijing
School of Physics and Technology of University of Kharkiv alumni
Theoretical physicists
National University of Kharkiv alumni
Chinese physicists